Tsar ( or ), also spelled czar, tzar, or csar, is a title used by East and South Slavic monarchs. The term is derived from the Latin word caesar, which was intended to mean "emperor" in the European medieval sense of the term—a ruler with the same rank as a Roman emperor, holding it by the approval of another emperor or a supreme ecclesiastical official (the Pope or the Ecumenical Patriarch)—but was usually considered by western Europeans to be equivalent to "king".  It lends its name to a system of government, tsarist autocracy or tsarism.

"Tsar" and its variants were the official titles of the following states:
 Bulgarian Empire (First Bulgarian Empire in 681–1018, Second Bulgarian Empire in 1185–1396), and also used in Tsardom of Bulgaria, in 1908–1946
 Serbian Empire, in 1346–1371
 Tsardom of Russia, in 1547–1721 (replaced in 1721 by imperator in Russian Empire, but still remaining in use, also officially in relation to several regions until 1917)

The first ruler to adopt the title tsar was Simeon I of Bulgaria. Simeon II, the last tsar of Bulgaria, is the last person to hold this title.

Meaning in Slavic languages
The title tsar is derived from the Latin title for the Roman emperors, caesar. In comparison to the corresponding Latin word imperator, the Byzantine Greek term basileus was used differently depending on whether it was in a contemporary political context or in a historical or Biblical context.

Bulgaria

In 705 Emperor Justinian II named Tervel of Bulgaria "caesar", the first foreigner to receive this title, but his descendants continued to use Bulgar title "Kanasubigi". The sainted Boris I is sometimes retrospectively referred to as tsar, because at his time Bulgaria was converted to Christianity.  However, the title "tsar" (and its Byzantine Greek equivalent basileus) was actually adopted and used for the first time by his son Simeon I, following a makeshift imperial coronation performed by the Patriarch of Constantinople in 913.  After an attempt by the Byzantine Empire to revoke this major diplomatic concession and a decade of intensive warfare, the imperial title of the Bulgarian ruler was recognized by the Byzantine government in 924 and again at the formal conclusion of peace in 927.  Since in Byzantine political theory there was place for only two emperors, Eastern and Western (as in the Late Roman Empire), the Bulgarian ruler was crowned basileus as "a spiritual son" of the Byzantine basileus.

It has been hypothesized that Simeon's title was also recognized by a papal mission to Bulgaria in or shortly after 925, as a concession in exchange for a settlement in the Bulgarian-Croatian conflict or a possible attempt to return Bulgaria to union with Rome. Thus, in the later diplomatic correspondence conducted in 1199–1204 between the Bulgarian ruler Kaloyan and Pope Innocent III, Kaloyan—whose self-assumed Latin title was "Imperator Bulgarorum et Blachorum"—claims that the imperial crowns of Simeon I, his son Peter I, and Samuel were somehow derived from the papacy. The pope, however, only speaks of reges (kings) of Bulgaria in his replies, and eventually grants only that lesser title to Kaloyan, who nevertheless proceeds to thank the pope for the "imperial title" conferred upon him.

After Bulgaria's liberation from the Ottomans in 1878, its new monarchs were at first autonomous prince (knyaz). With the declaration of full independence, Ferdinand I of Bulgaria adopted the traditional title "tsar" in 1908 and it was used until the abolition of the monarchy in 1946.  However, these titles were not generally perceived as equivalents of "emperor" any longer. In the Bulgarian as in the Greek vernacular, the meaning of the title had shifted (although Paisius' Slavonic-Bulgarian History (1760–1762) had still distinguished between the two concepts).

Kievan Rus'
"Tsar" was used once by church officials of Kievan Rus' in the naming of Yaroslav the Wise of Kiev. This may be connected to Yaroslav's war against Byzantium and to his efforts to distance himself from Constantinople. However, other princes of Kievan Rus' never styled themselves as tsars. Russian lands used the term tsar from 1547 when Knyaz (Russian: Князь) Ivan IV the Terrible was officially crowned tsar of all Rus'.

Serbia

The title of tsar (Serbian car) was used officially by two monarchs, the previous monarchial title being that of king (kralj). In 1345, Stefan Dušan began to style himself "Emperor of Serbs and Greeks" (the Greek renderings read "basileus and autokrator of Serbs and Romans"), and was crowned as such in Skopje on Easter (April 16) 1346 by the newly elevated Serbian patriarch, alongside the Bulgarian patriarch and archbishop of Ohrid. On the same occasion, he had his wife Helena of Bulgaria crowned as empress and his son associated in power as king. When Dušan died in 1355, his son Stefan Uroš V became the next emperor. The new emperor's uncle Simeon Uroš (Siniša) contested the succession and claimed the same titles as a dynast in Thessaly. After his death around 1370, he was succeeded in his claims by his son John Uroš, who retired to a monastery in about 1373.

Russia 

The first Russian ruler to openly break with the khan of the Golden Horde, Mikhail of Tver, assumed the title "basileus of Rus" and "tsar".

Following his assertion of independence from the khan, "Veliki Kniaz" Ivan III of Muscovy started to use the title of tsar regularly in diplomatic relations with the West. From about 1480, he is designated as "imperator" in his Latin correspondence, as "keyser" in his correspondence with the Swedish regent, as "kejser" in his correspondence with the Danish king, Teutonic Knights, and the Hanseatic League. Ivan's son Vasily III continued using these titles. Sigismund von Herberstein observed that the titles of "kaiser" and "imperator" were attempts to render the Russian term "tsar" into German and Latin, respectively.

This was related to Russia's growing ambitions to become an Orthodox "Third Rome", after the Fall of Constantinople. The Muscovite ruler was recognized as an emperor by Holy Roman Emperor Maximilian I in 1514. However, the first Russian ruler to be formally crowned as Tsar of All Rus was Ivan IV, until then known as Grand Prince of all the Russias. Some foreign ambassadors—namely, Herberstein (in 1516 and 1525), Daniel Printz a Buchau (in 1576 and 1578) and Just Juel (in 1709)—indicated that the word "tsar" should not be translated as "emperor", because it is applied by Russians to David, Solomon and other Biblical kings, who are simple reges. On the other hand, Jacques Margeret, a bodyguard of False Demetrius I, argues that the title of "tsar" is more honorable for Muscovites than "kaiser" or "king" exactly because it was God and not some earthly potentate who ordained to apply it to David, Solomon, and other kings of Israel. Samuel Collins, a court physician to Tsar Alexis in 1659–66, styled the latter "Great Emperor", commenting that "as for the word Czar, it has so near relation to Cesar... that it may well be granted to signifie Emperor. The Russians would have it to be an higher title than King, and yet they call David Czar, and our kings, Kirrols, probably from Carolus Quintus, whose history they have among them".

The title tsar remained in common usage, and also officially as the designator of various titles signifying rule over various states absorbed by the Muscovite monarchy (such as the former Tatar khanates and the Georgian Orthodox kingdom). In the 18th century, it was increasingly viewed as inferior to "emperor" or highlighting the oriental side of the term. Upon annexing Crimea in 1783, Catherine the Great adopted the hellenicized title "tsaritsa of Tauric Chersonesos", rather than "tsaritsa of the Crimea". By 1815, when a large part of Poland was annexed, the title had clearly come to be interpreted in Russia as the equivalent of Polish król ("king"), and the Russian emperor assumed the title "tsar of Poland".

By 1894, when Nicholas II ascended the throne, the full title of the Russian rulers was "By the grace of God Almighty, the Emperor and Supreme Autocrat of all the Russias, Tsar of Moscow, Kiev, Vladimir, Novgorod, Kazan, Astrakhan, Poland, Siberia, Tauric Chersonese, and Georgia, Lord of Pskov, Grand Duke of Smolensk, Lithuania, Volhynia, Podolia and Finland, Prince of Estonia, Livonia, Courland and Semigalia, Samogitia, Białystok, Karelia, Tver, Yugra, Perm, Vyatka, Bulgaria, and other territories; Lord and Grand Duke of Nizhny Novgorod, Chernigov; Ruler of Ryazan, Polotsk, Rostov, Yaroslavl, Beloozero, Udoria, Obdoria, Kondia, Vitebsk, Mstislav, and all northern territories; Ruler of Iveria, Kartalinia, and the Kabardinian lands and Armenian territories; hereditary Ruler and Lord of the Cherkess and Mountain Princes and others; Lord of Turkestan, Heir of Norway, Duke of Schleswig-Holstein, Stormarn, Dithmarschen, Oldenburg".

Metaphorical uses

Like many lofty titles, such as mogul, tsar or czar has been used in English as a metaphor for positions of high authority since 1866 (referring to U.S. President Andrew Johnson), with a connotation of dictatorial powers and style, fitting since "autocrat" was an official title of the Russian Emperor (informally referred to as 'the tsar'). Similarly, Speaker of the House Thomas Brackett Reed was called "Czar Reed" for his dictatorial control of the House of Representatives in the 1880s and 1890s.

In the United States and in the United Kingdom, the title "czar" is a colloquial term for certain high-level civil servants, such as the "drug czar" for the director of the Office of National Drug Control Policy (not to be confused with a drug baron), "terrorism czar" for a presidential advisor on terrorism policy, "cybersecurity czar" for the highest-ranking Department of Homeland Security official on computer security and information security policy, and "war czar" to oversee the wars in Iraq and Afghanistan. More specifically, a czar in the US government typically refers to a sub-cabinet-level advisor within the executive branch. One of the earliest known usages of the term was for Judge Kenesaw Mountain Landis, who was named commissioner of baseball, with broad powers to clean up the sport after it had been sullied by the Black Sox scandal of 1919.

See also 
 Succession of the Roman Empire
 List of Bulgarian monarchs
 List of Russian rulers
 List of Serbian monarchs
 Tsarevets (fortress)
 Tsarina
 Tsarevich
 Tsesarevich
 Vozhd

Notes

References

Citations

Sources 

 Michael and Natasha, The Life and love of the Last Tsar of Russia, Rosemary & Donald Crawford, Weidenfeld & Nicolson, London 1997. .
 George Ostrogorsky, "Avtokrator i samodržac", Glas Srpske kraljevske akadamije CLXIV, Drugi razdred 84 (1935), 95–187
 John V.A. Fine, Jr., The Early Medieval Balkans, Ann Arbor, 1983
 John V.A. Fine, Jr., The Late Medieval Balkans, Ann Arbor, 1987
 Robert O. Crummey, The Formation of Muscovy 1304–1613, New York, 1987
 David Warnes, Chronicle of the Russian Tsars, London, 1999
 Matthew Lang (Editor),  The Chronicle - $10 Very Cheap, Sydney, 2009/10

External links

 EtymOnline

Heads of state
Russian Empire
Imperial titles
 
Slavic titles
Titles of national or ethnic leadership
Bulgarian noble titles
Serbian noble titles
Emperors